Gaddafi, Gadhafi, or Qaddafi is a surname and given name.

Surname
 Wanis al-Qaddafi (1924–1986), a Prime Minister of Libya from 1968 to 1969
 Muammar Gaddafi (1942–2011), Libya's leader from 1969 to 2011
 Muhammad Gaddafi (born 1970), eldest son of Muammar
 Saif al-Islam Gaddafi (born 1972), son of Muammar
 Al-Saadi Gaddafi (born 1973), son of Muammar, soccer player
 Hannibal Muammar Gaddafi (born 1975), son of Muammar
 Ayesha Gaddafi (born 1976), daughter of Muammar
 Mutassim Gaddafi (1977–2011), son of Muammar
 Saif al-Arab Gaddafi (1982–2011), son of Muammar
 Khamis Gaddafi (1983–2011), son of Muammar
 Ahmed Gaddaf al-Dam (born 1952), cousin of Muammar

Given name
 Khadaffy Janjalani (1975–2006), leader of the Abu Sayyaf militant group

See also
 Qadhadhfa or Gaddafa, the Libyan tribe derived name 
 Yaki Kadafi (1977–1996), American rapper
 Tragedy Khadafi, American rapper

Arabic-language surnames